Highway M03 is a Ukrainian international highway (M-highway) connecting Kyiv with Dovzhansky on the border with Russia, where it continues into Russia as the A270. It is part of European route E40 from Kyiv to Debaltseve at which it is part of European route E50 to the border with Russia. At , the M03 is the longest international state highway in Ukraine.

In Soviet times the M03 was part of the M19. Today, the highway stretches through five oblasts and ends at the border checkpoint at Dovzhansky which is part of Sverdlovsk Raion (Luhansk Oblast). The route connects Kyiv and Kharkiv with the industrial region of Donbas. Part of the M03 between Kyiv and Boryspil was reconstructed into an automagistral to handle higher traffic between Kyiv and the Boryspil International Airport.

From Boryspil to Lubny, the road is a dual carriageway, thereon it continues as a single carriageway with some 2x2 sections.

Significant armed conflict has occurred on or near the eastern portions of the highway during the War in Donbas and the 2022 Russian Invasion of Ukraine.

Kyiv - Boryspil
Kyiv – Boryspil auto-magistrale is the better kept motorway in Ukraine. It provides direct access from Kyiv to the Boryspil International Airport. Its traffic passing ability amasses to 40,000 vehicle per day. The motorway is part of the M03 that stretches from Kyiv to the Russo-Ukrainian border at the Dovzhansky border checkpoint.

Route

See also

 Roads in Ukraine
 Ukraine Highways
 International E-road network
 Pan-European corridors

References

External links
 Kiev - Boryspil 
 International Roads in Ukraine in Russian
 European Roads in Russian

European route E40
European route E50
Roads in Donetsk Oblast
Roads in Kharkiv Oblast
Roads in Luhansk Oblast
Roads in Kyiv
Roads in Kyiv Oblast
Roads in Poltava Oblast